Mandarthi is a place located 12 km from Brahmavar in the Brahmavara taluk of Udupi District in Karnataka state, India. The name derives from 'Manda-Aarathi' from Kannada, meaning the holy light.

Legend/Myth
Long ago King Shankachooda was ruling Nagaloka. He had five daughters Devarathi, Nagarathi, Charurathi, Mandarathi, and Neelarathi.

Once, they went to Kailasa with an aspiration of marrying the Lord Subramanya Swamy, son of the Lord Shiva. These Five princesses were stopped by Nandi (Lord Shiva’s Devotee) on their way and were cursed to become snakes. Instantaneously, they were transformed into snakes and fell to earth. When Vyaghrapada Maharishi who was wandering in the Sahyadri Ghats saw these five snakes caught in the forest conflagration, and knew everything about them by his divine insight, he said to the five princesses (now Snakes) that their curse would be removed by a royal person in due course of time.

Meanwhile, the King of Avanthi Devavarma, who had been banished and wandering in disguise in the Sahyadri Mountains, saw these five snakes and decided to save them. He wrapped the snakes with a piece of cloth and started traveling towards the west. The snakes slid out of the cloth wrapper and reached a nearby termite hill. One of the snakes called, "Mandarathi" reached a part of the forest, which came to be called "Mandarthi" later.

The Nagakanyas appeared in a dream to King Devavarma, implying that Jalajakshi, the only princess of King Rajaditya, was in danger. Devavarma promptly saved the princess from danger and protected her.

The King of Hemadri Rajaditya was greatly pleased by this and gave his daughter Jalajakshi in marriage to Devavarma and enthroned him as the King of Hemadri.

Once, the queen Jalajakshi was seen by Mahisha a demon, who was born from the union of the sage Vyagrapadamuni with thamasic natured Kiratha woman. Mahisha, who was lustful, cast his evil eyes on the queen. He expressed his desire to marry her. When the queen opposed him, he became enraged and tried to possess her by force and violence. But all the efforts made by Mahisha were fruitless. The queen Jalajakshi who was deeply hurt and sad went to her palace and told the story to her husband Devavarma. Later, both of them decided to take shelter in the hermitage of Sudevamuni. Then, Mahisha became angry with the Muni for giving shelter to the royal couple and sent "Mahodara" a demon to attack his hermitage.

Sage Sudeavamuni was a great Tapaswi who had supernatural powers. He prayed the mother Durga to protect his ashram and the royal couple from Mahodara. All of a sudden a huge termite hill appeared before the demon and swallowed all the weapons used by him.

When Mahisha himself started fighting against the muni the royal couple prayed to the Divine mother Durga for protection. Then she appeared with all her might and splendor and ordered the divine spirits (Buthaganas) Veerabhadra, Haiguli, Kallukuttiga, Bobbarya to destroy all the demons.

Ultimately the demon Mahisha surrendered to the Divine Mother asked for a boon worshipped and the devotees who would do "Kenda Seva" should be amply rewarded. Later Mahisha laid his soul at the feet of the Divine mother.

Sage Sudeva and the royal couple prayed the goddess Durga with fervent devotion .Then mother Durga blessed them with assurance that she would manifest here at Mandarthi with all her power as Vana Durga.

Later Devavarma found the idol of Durga in Varahi River as was guided to him by the Lord Subramanya Swamy in a dream and consecrated it with all devotion.

Vana durge was worshipped by the Barkur dynasty. Any festivals, functions in the dynasty was initiated by performing puja at Vana Durge of Mandarthi. As vana durge, the idol had both the hands pointing downwards unlike the idol of today in which the right hand is pointing upwards indicating varada hasta.

It is said that more than 1500 years ago due to violent nature of Vana Durge generations of Archaka families used to get destroyed as punishment for the mistakes that used to happen in the kshetra. This phenomenon happened in every generation. When there was no body left in archaka family, royal king of Barkur brought a tulu brahmin family form Alevoor in Udupi District in order to carryout the temple's activities. These families can be found today in the surroundings of the temple.

It has been found in the records that during the times of 17th and 18th Century all of the children in the families of archaka used to die leaving only one of the children to carry out the day to day temple work. This phenomenon occurred throughout generations of archaka family. In the 18th century a solution was found out by the groups of archakas to convert the Vana Durge to Durgaparameshwari. It is also possible to convert back the Durgaparameshwari back to Vana durge with the hidden scripts. This would bring back the destruction. During this process a new idol was installed with one of the hands pointing up making Varada hasta. The old idol with both the hands pointing down used to be in the Tulsi katte in front of Veerabhadra until recently when it was removed by temple trust while renovating.

Until the early 19th century the temple was under Brahmin families. During British rule the temples used to be the people gathering place where meetings used to happen without the knowledge of the British. To prevent this the bill was passed to make all the temples secular and include people from other castes in the temple trust.

The temple has been renovated three times till now. The most recent renovation was done during 1956. This date can be found even today in the pillars of the temple.

Festivals
The temple celebrates Navarathri in a grand scale with chandihoma on all nine days. A five-day mathothsava in Makara Masa and Jatra in the month of Kumba are annual and important events while Darshan of Virabhadra and Kalkuda every Friday draws devotees like a magnet. Kenda seve (walking on fire) in front of hayguli and huli devaru is considered to safeguard Mangalya Bhagya (longevity of husband) of the married woman. The various cultural and religious activities and in particular the Yakshagana conducted in the premises of Mandarthi temple reflect the dedication and devotion of the people in continuing the rich traditions of the region.

Kannada  
Kundapura Kannada is the most widely spoken languages in Mandarthi.

Climate 
The climate in Mandarthi is hot in summers and pretty good in winter. In Summers (from march to May) temperature goes up to 40°C and in winters (from December to February) 32°C to 20°C.

Monsoon period During June to September rainfall is average with Heavy winds.

Nearest railway station 
 The Railway Stations which are near to temple are
 Barkur - 8 km ( Limited Train Stop )
 Udupi - 25 km
 Kundapura - 35 km

Nearest airport 
Mangalore (Bajpe) Airport is located at a distance of 75 km from the temple

See also 
 Kollur
 Udupi
 Anegudde
 Kundapura
 Saligrama

References

External links 
 Official MandrthiSite @ www.mandarthidurgaparameshwari.com
 Official Microsite @ www.templeinfo.in
 an Blog on Blogspot.com

Hindu temples in Udupi district